Ford is a city in Ford County, Kansas, United States.  As of the 2020 census, the population of the city was 203.

History
Ford was founded around 1885. It was named for Col. James Hobart Ford, a notable Union colonel and brevet brigadier general during the American Civil War.

The first post office in Ford was established in February 1885.

Geography
Ford is located at  (37.635977, -99.753013).

Demographics

2010 census
As of the census of 2010, there were 216 people, 96 households, and 59 families residing in the city. The racial makeup of the city was 87.0% White, 0.5% African American, 3.7% Native American, 6.9% from other races, and 1.9% from two or more races. Hispanic or Latino of any race were 8.3% of the population.

There were 96 households, of which 25.0% had children under the age of 18 living with them, 44.8% were married couples living together, 12.5% had a female householder with no husband present, 4.2% had a male householder with no wife present, and 38.5% were non-families. 33.3% of all households were made up of individuals, and 10.5% had someone living alone who was 65 years of age or older. The average household size was 2.25 and the average family size was 2.88.

The median age in the city was 44.1 years. 20.4% of residents were under the age of 18; 6% were between the ages of 18 and 24; 26.3% were from 25 to 44; 31.5% were from 45 to 64; and 15.7% were 65 years of age or older. The gender makeup of the city was 50.0% male and 50.0% female.

2000 census
As of the census of 2000, there were 314 people, 111 households, and 87 families residing in the city. The racial makeup of the city was 94.90% White, 0.32% Native American, 3.50% from other races, and 1.27% from two or more races. Hispanic or Latino of any race were 10.51% of the population.

There were 111 households, out of which 36.0% had children under the age of 18 living with them, 67.6% were married couples living together, 4.5% had a female householder with no husband present, and 21.6% were non-families. 20.7% of all households were made up of individuals, and 7.2% had someone living alone who was 65 years of age or older. The average household size was 2.83 and the average family size was 3.26.

In the city, the population was spread out, with 30.3% under the age of 18, 9.6% from 18 to 24, 30.3% from 25 to 44, 19.7% from 45 to 64, and 10.2% who were 65 years of age or older. The median age was 31 years. For every 100 females, there were 113.6 males. For every 100 females age 18 and over, there were 112.6 males.

The median income for a household in the city was $34,545, and the median income for a family was $36,346. Males had a median income of $27,917 versus $11,944 for females. The per capita income for the city was $15,037. About 8.7% of families and 9.7% of the population were below the poverty line, including 12.8% of those under age 18 and none of those age 65 or over.

Education
Ford is a part of USD 459 Bucklin. The Bucklin High School mascot is Bucklin Red Aces.

Ford High School was closed in school unification. The Ford Bulldogs won the Kansas State High School boys class BB Track & Field championship in 1964 and 1966.

See also
 Santa Fe Trail

References

Further reading

External links
 Ford - Directory of Public Officials
 Ford City Map, KDOT

Cities in Kansas
Cities in Ford County, Kansas